Aleksander Rajčević (born 17 November 1986) is a Slovenian footballer who plays as a defender for Italian club Kras Repen. In 2010, Rajčević was named in Slovenia's preliminary 30-man squad for the 2010 FIFA World Cup in South Africa, but failed to make it to the final 23.

Honours
Koper
Slovenian PrvaLiga: 2009–10
Slovenian Cup: 2005–06, 2006–07, 2021–22

Maribor
Slovenian PrvaLiga: 2010–11, 2011–12, 2012–13, 2013–14, 2014–15, 2016–17, 2018–19
Slovenian Cup: 2011–12, 2012–13, 2015–16
Slovenian Supercup: 2012, 2013, 2014

References

External links

Player profile at NZS 

1986 births
Living people
Sportspeople from Koper
Slovenian footballers
Association football defenders
Slovenia youth international footballers
Slovenia under-21 international footballers
Slovenia international footballers
Slovenian Second League players
Slovenian PrvaLiga players
FC Koper players
NK Maribor players
Slovenian expatriate footballers
Expatriate footballers in Italy
Slovenian expatriate sportspeople in Italy